State Route 115 (SR 115) is a state highway outside the city of Fallon, Nevada in the United States.  Known as Harrigan Road, SR 115 starts at an intersection with SR 119 (Berney Road) and runs north to an intersection with Stillwater Avenue, paralleling U.S. Route 95 (US 95).

History
In the late 1950s, modern SR 115 was part of SR 2 and U.S. Route 50 Alternate, which began at SR 119 (then part of US 50) and followed Stillwater Avenue, East Street, and Center Street to end at Maine Street (also then US 50). This alternate route had previously been part of US 50, which was moved to follow present SR 119 and US 95 to Maine Street. US 50 has since been realigned again to leave Fallon on former SR 42 and turn southeast to rejoin the old alignment at Grimes Point.

Major intersections

See also

References

115
Transportation in Churchill County, Nevada
Lincoln Highway
U.S. Route 50